Ceropegia dinteri is a species of plant in the family Apocynaceae. It is endemic to Namibia.  Its natural habitats are subtropical or tropical dry shrubland and rocky areas.

References

dinteri
Endemic flora of Namibia
Least concern plants
Taxonomy articles created by Polbot